In Greek mythology, the Daphnaie are the nymphs of the laurel trees.

Like the other Dryads, they are the spirits of the trees and spend most of their time sleeping behind the bark. They only come out to dance when the coast is clear.

They are named after Daphne ('Laurel'), one of the naiads who was plagued with unwanted sexual advances until she cried to Gaia for help. The Earth Mother took pity on her and turned Daphne into a laurel tree.

References 

Dryads

Nymphs
Dance in Greek mythology